Francisco Valinés Cofresí (1878-1949) was an architect in Puerto Rico.

He was born in Cabo Rojo in 1878. His mother's family were relatives of the outlaw and pirate Roberto Cofresi.

Cofresí began working as a cabinetmaker foreman at the San Juan firm Finlay, Waymouth & Lee. Later on he studied architecture by correspondence, with the International Correspondence School of Chicago, Illinois, completing his studies in 1912.

At least two of his works are listed for their architecture on the U.S. National Register of Historic Places (NRHP).

Works
his first major work was the Executive Mansion for the governor (la Mansión Ejecutiva of the Gobernador) of the U.S. Virgin Islands, in Saint John
the residence of José Calderón in Canóvanas
the residence of Angel Suárez in Guaynabo
La Giralda, 651 Jose Marti St., Santurce, San Juan, Puerto Rico, NRHP-listed
Palmira Lopez de Pereyo House, jct. of Font Martelo and Minerva Sts. Humacao, Puerto Rico, NRHP-listed
Original landscaping for the Luis Muñoz Rivera Park in San Juan, PR

References

1878 births
1949 deaths
Puerto Rican architects
People from Cabo Rojo, Puerto Rico